The 9th Infantry Brigade (Lebanon) is a Lebanese Army unit that fought in the Lebanese Civil War, being active since its creation in January 1984.

Origins
In the aftermath of the June–September 1982 Israeli invasion of Lebanon, President Amin Gemayel, convinced that a strong and unified national defense force was a prerequisite to rebuilding the nation, announced plans to raise a 60,000-man army organized into twelve brigades (created from existing infantry regiments), trained and equipped by France and the United States. On March 1, 1983, the 9th Infantry Regiment was amalgamated with the Anti-tank Regiment, the Engineering Regiment and the 801st battalion into a brigade group numbering 2,000 men, mostly Maronite Christians from the northern Akkar and Koura Districts, though it also contained Sunni and Shia Muslims. Initially designated the General Support Brigade – GSB (Arabic: لواء الدعم العام | Liwa' al-Daem al-Eami), the new unit changed its name on September 10 of that year to "9th Brigade", which officially became on January 1, 1984, the 9th Infantry Brigade.

Emblem
The Brigade's emblem consists of a grip holding a crossed red lightning symbolizing permanent readiness and rapid execution and the sword of Law, surmounted by an Arabic numeral (9) in gold and two drops of blood below symbolizing self-donation with no limits, all set on a black background.

Structure and organization
The new unit grew from an understrength battalion comprising three rifle companies to a fully equipped mechanized infantry brigade, capable of aligning a Headquarters' (HQ) battalion, an armoured battalion (94th) equipped with Panhard AML-90 armoured cars, AMX-13 light tanks (replaced in the 1990s by T-55A tanks donated by Syria) and M48A5 main battle tanks, three mechanized infantry battalions (91st, 92nd and 93rd) issued with M113, AMX-VCI, Panhard M3 VTT and VAB armored personnel carriers, plus an artillery battalion (95th) fielding US M114 155 mm howitzers. The Brigade also fielded a logistics battalion, equipped with US M151A2 jeeps, Land-Rover long wheelbase series III, Chevrolet C20 and Dodge Ram (1st generation) pickups and US M35A2 2½-ton military trucks. Headquartered at the Sayyad Roundabout Barracks in the Hazmiyeh district of east Beirut, the brigade was initially commanded by Colonel Mounir Merhi, replaced in 1984 by Col. Ghassan Ged, a Greek Orthodox. In 1985 he was replaced by Col. Sami Rihana, also a Greek Orthodox, in turn succeeded in 1989 by Col. Yamine.

Combat history

The Lebanese Civil War

The Mountain War 1983-1984
Commanded by Colonel Mounir Merhi, the 9th Brigade during the Mountain War was deployed at the Hazmiyeh and Sin el Fil eastern suburbs of Beirut. During the Battle for west Beirut on February 6, 1984, the 91st Infantry Battalion and the 94th Armoured Battalion under the command of Colonel Sami Rihana reinforced the other Lebanese Army units deployed in the western sector of the city fighting the anti-Government Muslim militias. Placed at the disposal of the Seventh Brigade's Command, these two battalions were positioned between the Port district and the Sodeco Square in the Nasra (Nazareth) neighbourhood of the Achrafieh district of east Beirut.

The post-Chouf years 1984-1990
Regarded as being totally loyal to General Michel Aoun's interim military government, the majority of the brigade's battalions – except one (92nd), deployed at the Port district – were placed along the Hazmiyeh sector of the Green Line, where they fought successfully the Lebanese Forces (LF) militia faction led by Elie Hobeika during his failed coup attempt to seize control of east Beirut on January 16, 1986. The Brigade battled again the LF in February 1990, this time at the Badaro-Furn esh Shebbak sector during the Elimination War.

The post-civil war years 1990-present
Upon the end of the war in October 1990, the 9th Brigade was re-integrated into the structure of the Lebanese Armed Forces (LAF).

See also
 Amal Movement
 Lebanese Armed Forces
 Lebanese Civil War
 Lebanese Forces
 List of weapons of the Lebanese Civil War
 January 1986 Lebanese Forces coup
 Mountain War (Lebanon)
 Progressive Socialist Party
 People's Liberation Army (Lebanon)
 1st Infantry Brigade (Lebanon)
 2nd Infantry Brigade (Lebanon)
 3rd Infantry Brigade (Lebanon)
 4th Infantry Brigade (Lebanon)
 5th Infantry Brigade (Lebanon)
 6th Infantry Brigade (Lebanon)
 7th Infantry Brigade (Lebanon)
 8th Infantry Brigade (Lebanon)
 10th Infantry Brigade (Lebanon)
 11th Infantry Brigade (Lebanon)
 12th Infantry Brigade (Lebanon)

Notes

References

Aram Nerguizian, Anthony H. Cordesman & Arleigh A. Burke, The Lebanese Armed Forces: Challenges and Opportunities in Post-Syria Lebanon, Burke Chair in Strategy, Center for Strategic & International Studies (CSIS), First Working Draft: February 10, 2009. –  
Are J. Knudsen, Lebanese Armed Forces: A United Army for a Divided Country?, CMI INSIGHT, November 2014 No 9, Chr. Michelsen Institute (CMI), Bergen - Norway. – 
 Denise Ammoun, Histoire du Liban contemporain: Tome 2 1943-1990, Éditions Fayard, Paris 2005.  (in French) – 
 Edgar O'Ballance, Civil War in Lebanon 1975-92, Palgrave Macmillan, London 1998. 
 Éric Micheletti and Yves Debay, Liban – dix jours aux cœur des combats, RAIDS magazine n.º41, October 1989 issue.  (in French)
James Kinnear, Stephen Sewell & Andrey Aksenov, Soviet T-54 Main Battle Tank, General Military series, Osprey Publishing Ltd, Oxford 2018. 
James Kinnear, Stephen Sewell & Andrey Aksenov, Soviet T-55 Main Battle Tank, General Military series, Osprey Publishing Ltd, Oxford 2019. 
John C. Rolland (ed.), Lebanon: Current Issues and Background, Nova Science Publishers, Hauppauge, New York 2003.  – 
Joseph Hokayem, L'armée libanaise pendant la guerre: un instrument du pouvoir du président de la République (1975-1985), Lulu.com, Beyrouth 2012. , 1291036601 (in French) – 
 Ken Guest, Lebanon, in Flashpoint! At the Front Line of Today's Wars, Arms and Armour Press, London 1994, pp. 97–111.  
 Matthew S. Gordon, The Gemayels (World Leaders Past & Present), Chelsea House Publishers, 1988. 
 Moustafa El-Assad, Civil Wars Volume 1: The Gun Trucks, Blue Steel books, Sidon 2008. 
Oren Barak, The Lebanese Army – A National institution in a divided society, State University of New York Press, Albany 2009.  – 
 Rex Brynen, Sanctuary and Survival: the PLO in Lebanon, Boulder: Westview Press, Oxford 1990.  – 
Robert Fisk, Pity the Nation: Lebanon at War, London: Oxford University Press, (3rd ed. 2001).  – 
 Samer Kassis, 30 Years of Military Vehicles in Lebanon, Beirut: Elite Group, 2003. 
 Samer Kassis, Véhicules Militaires au Liban/Military Vehicles in Lebanon 1975-1981, Trebia Publishing, Chyah 2012. 
 Samuel M. Katz, Lee E. Russel, and Ron Volstad, Armies in Lebanon 1982-84, Men-at-Arms series 165, Osprey Publishing Ltd, London 1985. 
 Samuel M. Katz and Ron Volstad, Arab Armies of the Middle East wars 2, Men-at-Arms series 194, Osprey Publishing Ltd, London 1988.  
 Steven J. Zaloga, Tank battles of the Mid-East Wars (2): The wars of 1973 to the present, Concord Publications, Hong Kong 2003.  – 
Thomas Collelo (ed.), Lebanon: a country study, Library of Congress, Federal Research Division, Headquarters, Department of the Army (DA Pam 550-24), Washington D.C., December 1987 (Third edition 1989). – 
Yann Mahé, La Guerre Civile Libanaise, un chaos indescriptible (1975-1990), Trucks & Tanks Magazine n.º 41, January–February 2014, pp. 78–81.  (in French)
Zachary Sex & Bassel Abi-Chahine, Modern Conflicts 2 – The Lebanese Civil War, From 1975 to 1991 and Beyond, Modern Conflicts Profile Guide Volume II, AK Interactive, 2021. ISBN 8435568306073

External links
Histoire militaire de l'armée libanaise de 1975 à 1990 (in French)
Lebanese Armed Forces (LAF) Official Website
Lebanon Military Guide from GlobalSecurity.org
CIA - The World Factbook - Lebanon
Global Fire Power - Lebanon Military Strength
Lebanon army trying to rearm and modernize itself
Lebanese Military Wish List 2008/2009 - New York Times

Military units and formations of Lebanon
Military units and formations established in 1984
1984 establishments in Lebanon

bn:লেবাননের সামরিক বাহিনী
fr:Armée libanaise